Site diversity is one of six techniques used to improve the reliability of satellite communications by limit atmospheric effects, particularly those caused by rain fade. A diversity scheme is typically required when using frequencies in the Ka, V, or W-band. The downlink transmissions of satellites cover very large areas, that will have different weather. The site diversity technique consists of linking two or more ground stations receiving the same signal: this way, if the signal is heavily attenuated in one area, another ground stations can compensate it. These intense rain areas, for example, supercells, often have a horizontal length of no more than a few kilometers: putting the ground stations at a sufficient distance the possibility of rain fade in the downlink signal will be reduced.

The configuration works when the attenuation is not great at the two stations simultaneously.  This is usually a valid assumption.  Site diversity systems have been known to minimize disruption of service by major satellite carriers.

See also
Diversity scheme
Diversity combining

References

Satellite television